Hittite may refer to:

 Hittites, ancient Anatolian people
 Hittite language, the earliest-attested Indo-European language
 Hittite grammar
 Hittite phonology
 Hittite cuneiform
 Hittite inscriptions
 Hittite laws
 Hittite religion
 Hittite music
 Hittite art
 Hittite cuisine
 Hittite navy
 Hittite kings
 Hittite sites
 Hittite studies
 Syro-Hittite states, Iron Age states located in modern Turkey and Syria
 Biblical Hittites, also known as the "Children of Heth"
 Hittite Microwave Corporation, a former semiconductor manufacturer now owned by Analog Devices

See also 

Language and nationality disambiguation pages